"Paste" is a 5,800-word short story by Henry James first published in Frank Leslie’s Popular Monthly in December 1899. James included the story in his collection, The Soft Side, published by Macmillan the following year. James conceived the story as a clever reversal of Guy de Maupassant's "The Necklace".

Plot summary

After the death of her aunt, the protagonist Charlotte and her cousin, her aunt’s stepson Arthur Prime, find a tin of imitation jewelry which includes a string of pearls. Charlotte is immediately fascinated with the pearls, and wonders if they could be a gift from when her aunt was an actress. Arthur disputes this and is insulted at the thought of some gentleman other than his father giving his stepmother such a gift. Charlotte quickly apologizes and agrees that the pearls could be nothing more than paste. With Arthur’s enthusiastic approval, she keeps the jewelry in memory of her aunt.

When Charlotte returns to her governess job, her friend, Mrs. Guy, asks her if she has anything to add color to her dress for an upcoming party. When Charlotte shows Mrs. Guy the jewelry, she too becomes fascinated with the string of pearls, insisting that they are genuine. Mrs. Guy wears the string to the party; and when Charlotte finds out that everyone believed that they were real, she insists that they must be returned to her cousin. Mrs. Guy claims that it was Arthur's foolishness to have given away the necklace, and that Charlotte should feel no guilt in keeping it.

However, Charlotte decides to return the pearls to her cousin, who still refuses to consider the pearls real. A month later Mrs. Guy shows her a wonderful string of pearls, telling Charlotte that they are the same ones that Charlotte had inherited from her aunt. Charlotte is surprised because Arthur claimed he had shattered them, when in fact he had sold them to the store where Mrs. Guy bought them.

Major themes 
"Paste" is one of James' briefest and lightest fictions, but the story explores the contrast between reality and illusion that often fascinated its author in such longer and weightier tales as The Turn of the Screw. By his own account in the New York Edition preface, James consciously reversed Maupassant's grim melodrama of a fake necklace thought to be real into a pleasant comedy of a real necklace thought to be fake.

In such a very short story, the characters can only be sketched in miniature, but they all come into focus. Charlotte is charming and naive, Arthur priggish and pompous, and Mrs. Guy managerial and sensuous. The story ends with a "lurid" suggestion that Mrs. Guy may have obtained the necklace from Arthur in a private transaction rather than at a jewelry store.

References
 The Tales of Henry James by Edward Wagenknecht (New York: Frederick Ungar Publishing Co., 1984)

External links 

The New York Edition text of the story, with the author's preface (1909) 
 Note on the texts of Paste at the Library of America web site

1899 short stories
Short stories by Henry James
Works originally published in Frank Leslie's Illustrated Newspaper